"The Swarm" is a single by British band You Me at Six. The single was released on 18 March 2012 as a digital download in the United Kingdom. The single peaked at number 23 on the UK Singles Chart and number 1 on the UK Rock Chart.

Background
In March 2012, Thorpe Park announced they contacted You Me at Six to create the world's first roller coaster single for the launch of The Swarm. The song was released to iTunes on 18 March 2012, a few days after the opening of the coaster.

Track listing

Chart performance

Release history

References

2012 singles
You Me at Six songs
2011 songs
Virgin Records singles